The Santee River is a river in South Carolina in the United States, and is  long. The Santee and its tributaries provide the principal drainage for the coastal areas of southeastern South Carolina and navigation for the central coastal plain of South Carolina, emptying into the Atlantic Ocean about halfway between Myrtle Beach and Charleston near the community of McClellanville. Besides the Catawba, other principal rivers of the Santee watershed include the Congaree, Broad, Linville, Saluda and the Wateree. The watershed drains a large portion of the Piedmont regions of South and North Carolina. The Santee River is the second largest river on the eastern coast of the United States, second only to the Susquehanna River in drainage area and flow. Much of the upper river is impounded by the expansive, horn-shaped Lake Marion reservoir, formed by the -long Santee Dam. The dam was built during the Great Depression of the 1930s as a Works Progress Administration (WPA) project to provide a major source of hydroelectric power for the state of South Carolina.

Description
A navigable diversion canal first built in the 1970s at the southern tip of the lake connects to Lake Moultrie, a reservoir on the nearby Cooper River. The modern canal is operated by Santee Cooper as part of the larger hydroelectric project on both rivers. The dam was finished in 1941.

Downstream from the reservoir it flows east, then southeast, forming the northeast boundary of Francis Marion National Forest.

History

The river was named by early English settlers after the Santee tribe, which inhabited areas on the middle part of the river. The first European contact was by a Spanish party led by Lucas Vázquez de Ayllón in 1526. The Spaniards called the river the Jordan in honor of the Jordan River.

After suffering a defeat by the English and their allies during the Yamasee War in 1715–1716, the Santee were relocated.  Many were shipped as slaves to the West Indies, opening up the river for British settlement as part of the Carolina Colony. Most of the Siouan peoples had migrated into the upper Midwest before European encounter.

In the late 18th century, the upper river was the site of the homestead of Francis Marion, a patriot of the American Revolutionary War. The original site of his homestead has been flooded by Lake Marion, which is named in his honor.

Construction of the -long Santee Canal, linking the river to the Cooper, was begun in 1793 and finished in 1800. It allowed direct water transportation between the Upcountry of central South Carolina and Charleston, at the mouth of the Cooper and the harbor. The canal operated for 50 years before being made obsolete by the introduction of railroads.

During the Great Depression, the state of South Carolina created the Santee Cooper power utility. The main source of electric power for the utility came through federal construction during the administration of President Franklin D. Roosevelt of a hydroelectric project inland from Charleston. Starting in 1939, the Santee River was dammed, forming lakes Marion and Moultrie, and diverting the river's flow into the Cooper River through a hydroelectric plant at Pinopolis. The WPA project was completed in 1941.

Though the project succeeded in providing cheap electricity to modernize rural South Carolina, unintended consequences were changes to the character of both the Cooper and Santee rivers below the project. Deprived of most its water flow, the Santee River became more saline and its ecosystem gradually changed below the dam.  The Cooper River received more of the freshwater and sediment loads that used to flow into the Santee and carried them downstream.  This has resulted in greatly increasing the dredging costs to keep Charleston Harbor operating as a port. In the 1980s, the Army Corps of Engineers built a "rediversion" canal to send most of the water back into the Santee, partially mitigating this problem.

Crossings
This is a partial list of crossings of the Santee River
 Lake Marion
 Railroad bridge (CSX Orangeburg Subdivision) between Lone Star and Rimini. (note: This location has been proposed by representative James Clyburn for a new automobile bridge; there is considerable controversy over the project because of its potential environmental effects.)
 Former US 15 and US 301 bridge at Santee
 Interstate 95, US 15 and US 301 bridge between Santee and North Santee
 Lower Santee
 Highway 52 bridge
 Railroad bridge (CSX Charleston Subdivision) near St. Stephen
 ALT US 17 bridge and adjacent railroad bridge
 US 17 bridge (S Fraser Street) over North Santee River and South Santee River

See also
List of South Carolina rivers
 South Atlantic-Gulf Water Resource Region

References

External links
South Carolina Dept. of Health and Environmental Control: Santee Basin
Santee Nation History
Santee Cooper Lake System
Old Santee Canal Park
Carolina Living: History of the Carolina Lakes
Santee Canal

South Atlantic Water Science Center Santee River Basin Study

 
Rivers of South Carolina